David Wippman is an American academic administrator, attorney, and legal scholar working as the 20th president of Hamilton College in Upstate New York.

Education 
Wippman graduated summa cum laude with an A.B. in English from Princeton University in 1976 after completing a 143-page long senior thesis titled "Malory and the Fall of Camelot." He then received an M.A. in English literature from Yale University, and a J.D. from Yale Law School. During law school, Wippman served as the editor-in-chief of the Yale Law Journal. He also clerked for Wilfred Feinberg, a Judge of the United States Court of Appeals for the Second Circuit.

Career 
After graduating from law school, Wippman practiced law in Washington, D.C., specializing in international law and political consulting. He served as vice provost of Cornell University for international relations and dean of the Cornell Law School. Prior to serving as president of Hamilton College, Wippman was dean of the University of Minnesota Law School. He has also been a visiting professor at Ulster University. Wippman took office as president on July 1, 2016, succeeding Joan Hinde Stewart.

On March 12, 2020, Wippman cancelled in-person instruction at Hamilton College for the rest of the spring semester. On June 1, 2020, Wippman co-authored an opinion piece in The New York Times about returning students to campus in the fall 2020 semester. Wippman has previously authored op-eds in The New York Times, The Hill, and Inside Higher Ed.

References 

Living people
Lawyers from Washington, D.C.
Princeton University alumni
Yale Graduate School of Arts and Sciences alumni
Yale Law School alumni
Hamilton College (New York) faculty
University of Minnesota Law School faculty
Cornell University faculty
Year of birth missing (living people)